Christophe Lattaignant (born 18 September 1971 in Boulogne-sur-Mer) is a French rowing cox. He competed for France at the 2004 Summer Olympics and won four medals at World Rowing Championships from 1995 through 2001.

External links 
 
 
 

1971 births
Living people
French male rowers
Coxswains (rowing)
People from Boulogne-sur-Mer
Olympic rowers of France
Rowers at the 2004 Summer Olympics
World Rowing Championships medalists for France
Sportspeople from Pas-de-Calais
21st-century French people